The Chevrier Lake is a freshwater body integrated into a set of lakes designated "Obatogamau Lakes", in the Eeyou Istchee James Bay (municipality) area, in the area of Nord-du-Québec, in the province of Quebec, Canada. This lake extends into the townships of Queylus, La Dauversière, Fancamp and Haüy.

Forestry is the main economic activity of the sector. Recreational tourism activities come second.

The hydrographic slope of Chevrier Lake is accessible by a branch of a forest road connecting to the north at route 113 (linking Lebel-sur-Quévillon and Chibougamau) and the Canadian National Railway.

The surface of Lake Chevrier is usually frozen from early November to mid-May, however safe ice circulation is generally mid-November to mid-April.

Geography

Toponymy
In 1910, the Hudson's Bay Company built on the east shore of La Dauversière Lake a cabin which will become over the years a place of storage. Finally this cabin was deserted. Originally known as "Dépôt-du-Lac-Chevrier". In 1988, this place name will be standardized in the form Dépôt-des-Lacs-Chevrier ", as a locality.

The toponym "Lac Chevrier" was formalized on December 5, 1968, by the Commission de toponymie du Québec, when it was created.

Notes and references

See also 

Eeyou Istchee James Bay
Lakes of Nord-du-Québec
Nottaway River drainage basin